Switchback is an American music duo active since 1993. Allmusic describes them as a mix of bluegrass, Americana and traditional Celtic music. The band is the musical partnership of Brian FitzGerald and Martin McCormack.

In 1986, FitzGerald was a mandolin student of Jethro Burns and had already been touring with Clifton Chenier when he met McCormack, an award-winning voice student of Whelma Oshiem at the American Conservatory of Chicago and a member of the Star Search selected band Beyond Blue.  They were both chosen by legendary County Kerry composer and concertina master Terrence 'Cuz' Teahan to join his traditional Irish group.  Teahan taught FitzGerald and McCormack the old country techniques of Irish musical entertainment, making them one of the last generations to be directly influenced by a master of this musical genre.
 
By 1988, shortly before Teahan's death, the duo continued his musical legacy with the Wailin' Banshees, joining forces with banjo great Bert McMahon of Woodford, County Galway and Chicago fiddle legend Mary McDonagh.
 
Their first album was a commercial success, with Chevrolet using one of the songs to promote their Chevy Blazer.  Their music eventually reached the ear of Grammy-winning producer Lloyd Maines, who then produced several albums for the band, with The Fire That Burns being selected as one of Performing Songwriter Magazine's top choices for 2003.  Throughout this time, the duo managed a heavy touring schedule, opening for such acts as The Moody Blues, Leon Russell, Lee Greenwood, John Hartford, and Beausoliel.
 
The Celtic music world never forgot the duo's Irish roots and Switchback continued to cultivate a following at concerts and festivals.  The duo has shared the stage with such notable Celtic musicians as Cherish the Ladies, Gaelic Storm, Liz Carroll, and John Williams.  They annually tour Ireland and frequently perform at the Westport, County Mayo pub owned by The Chieftain's Matt Malloy, who often appears there as well.
 
Playing over 200 engagements a year, Switchback can be heard at festivals ranging from the Stan Rogers Folk Festival in Nova Scotia to the Summer Celebration in Michigan where they performed for an audience of 15,000.  Their concerts take place at such venues as the intimately famous Bluebird Café of Nashville to the 3,400-seat Star Plaza Theater in Merrillville, Indiana. 
 
Switchback's music is frequently played on radio stations such as RTÉ Radio One with Pat Kenny in Dublin, Ireland and can also be seen on Public Broadcasting Television stations throughout the United States.

Recognition, memberships, and awards
 Irish Music Association: Top Duo in a Pub, Festival or Concert (US, IRE, EU, UK) 2008
 Illinois Arts Council ArtsTour Roster
 Illinois Arts Council Artist in Education
 Iowa Arts Council Performing Artist roster
 North American Folk Alliance Member
 Americana Music Association Member
 ASCAP-Plus Awards Recipient 2005–present

Instrumentation
 Brian FitzGerald: guitar, mandolin, vocals
 Martin McCormack: bass, guitar, vocals

Co-musicians:
 Nick Hirka: drums, banjo, bodhran, ukulele
 Keith Riker: percussion, bodhran, native American flute, harmonica
 Takeshi Horiuchi: bodhran, percussion

Collaborations
The following are some of the notable acts Switchback has performed with:

 Bryan Bowers
 Dale Watson
 Kansas
 Leon Russell
 Lloyd Maines
 The Moody Blues
 Tempest

Discography
 Ain't Going Back - 1994
 Check on Out - 1995
 Seven Rowdy Irish Tunes (and Two Sad Ones!) - 1996
 Good Church - 1997
 Dar's Place - 1998
 Nancy Whiskey - 2001
 The Fire That Burns - 2002
 10th Anniversary Collection - 2003
 Bolinree - 2005
 Falling Water River - 2006
 Ghosts of the River Folk - 2010
 Kanoka - 2013
 The Hibernian Mass - 2015

DVDs

 Celtic Sessions Vol. 1 and 2 (made from the PBS special of the same name)
 Americana Sessions Vo1. 1 and 2 (made from the PBS special of the same name)
 Turf Fire

References

External links
Official site

American musical duos